The Antamina Tailings Dam, also known as the Antamina Tailings Impoundment Facility, is a tailings dam located in the Huincush Ravine  east of Huaraz in the Ancash Region of Peru. The purpose of the dam is to store tailings processed at the nearby Antamina mine. In 2003, Golder Associates, Burnaby, B.C. was awarded the 2002 Canadian Consulting Engineering Award for its innovative design of the dam.

Background
The dam was designed by Golder Associates, Burnaby, B.C. and Ingetec SA between 1998 and 1999. A  reservoir was filled behind the dam assist the concentrater.

Design and operation
As a base for the dam, a  concrete-face rock-fill dam was constructed. From there, the dam is being raised with rock-fill with the upstream side being protected by a concrete slab. The dam will hold  of tailings and the mine is expected to produce . Upstream of the dam, a series of channels and embankments divert water from the Ayash River from entering the reservoir. This helps the environment and protects the stability of the dam. The reservoir is lined with a geomembrane which controls seepage of tailings into the environment. Water released into the environment is purified to meet standards and discharges from the dam are maintained at at least 150 liters per second.

References

External links
Antamina mine Official Site

Dams in Peru
Tailings dams
Concrete-face rock-fill dams
Mining in Peru
Dams completed in 2001
Buildings and structures in Ancash Region